Keks FM was a Russian language adult hits radio station which formerly broadcast in Moscow, Russia on 89.9 MHz, Saint Petersburg, Russia on 91.1 MHz and Voronezh, Russia on 102.3 MHz. The stations' format was based on Jack FM's format.

See also
Jack FM
Adult hits

External links
https://web.archive.org/web/20090103053819/http://www.kekc.fm/  (Russian)

Russian-language radio stations
Adult hits radio stations
Mass media in Moscow
Internet radio stations
Radio stations established in 2007
Radio stations disestablished in 2016
Defunct radio stations in Russia